Matua may refer to:

People
 Hotu Matuꞌa, legendary first settler and chief of Easter Island and ancestor of the Rapa Nui people
 Matua (priest) (fl. 1838), High Priest of Mangareva
 Fred Matua (1984–2012), American football player
 Henare Matua (c.1838–1894), New Zealand tribal leader, reformer, and politician

Places
 Matua (island), in the Kuril Islands chain
 Matua, New Zealand, a suburb of Tauranga

Other uses
 Matua (spider), a spider genus
 Matua Mahasangha, a sect of Hinduism in Bengal
 Matua, a social caste of the Chamorro people

See also